This is a list of events in Scottish television from 1980.

Events

January
7 January - Grampian Today is relaunched as North Tonight, as part of an effort to reflect northern Scotland as a whole. 1980 also sees Grampian introduces weekday lunchtime and closedown news bulletins, called North News and North Headlines respectively.

February
19 February - Debut of the Scottish Television's soap Take the High Road.

March to November
No events.

December
1 December – BBC Scotland carries out a one-week experiment in breakfast television. It is a simulcast of BBC Radio Scotland's breakfast show Good Morning Scotland.
28 December – The IBA announces the results of the 1980 franchise round, revealing that all three of Scotland's ITV broadcasters have retained their franchises.

Unknown
Future British Prime Minister Gordon Brown becomes a journalist with Scottish Television.

Debuts

ITV
7 January - Grampian Today (1980–2009)
19 February - Take the High Road (1980–2003)

Television series
Scotsport (1957–2008)
Reporting Scotland (1968–1983; 1984–present)
Top Club (1971–1998)
Scotland Today (1972–2009)
Sportscene (1975–Present)
The Beechgrove Garden (1978–Present)

Births
8 May - Michelle McManus, singer-songwriter, actress, radio and television presenter
21 November - Lisa McAllister, model and actress
Unknown - Kate Heavenor, Children's television presenter
Unknown - Bryan Swanson, television reporter

Deaths
9 February - Renée Houston, 77, comedy actor
12 February - Moultrie Kelsall, 78, actor

See also
1980 in Scotland

References

 
Television in Scotland by year
1980s in Scottish television